Bigger Than Tina is a 1999 Australian film about a young man obsessed with Tina Arena.

Plot
Dan Vardy-Cobb is an aspiring singer-songwriter living in the outer suburbs of Melbourne who dreams of becoming as successful as Tina Arena. He is taken on by talent agents Wes Grieves and Jacinta Fellows.

References

External links

Australian musical comedy films
1990s musical comedy films
1990s English-language films
1990s Australian films